Bargam may refer to:
 Bargam, Rezvanshahr (بارگام - Bārgām)
 Bargam, Rudsar (برگام - Bargām)
 Bargam language

See also
 Bagram